Crystal McLaurin-Coney, is an actress, model and host currently working in Los Angeles.  She has worked in the industry for over 15 years with such clients as Goody's Headache Powder, UPS, Hanes Her Way, The NC College Foundation and just recently completed a commercial for Secret Deodorant.  She also landed parts on the WB's One Tree Hill and the feature horror film Asylum.  She just completed the filming for an episode of the famed television series, Castle, which will air on January 12, 2012.

In one of her proudest moments, McLaurin-Coney captured the Miss North Carolina USA title in 1997 and went on to be the first African American to represent North Carolina in the Miss USA pageant. She did not place among the top ten semi-finalists in the nationally televised competition, but her preliminary average score ranked her fourteenth.

Crystal was born in North Carolina yet raised in 6 different states. She is a graduate of the University of North Carolina at Chapel Hill, where she obtained a degree in Journalism and Mass Communication with a concentration in Dramatic Arts.

Most recently, she was hired by HAMA Entertainment to host a show that covers "Hollywood" for Africa, as well as the opportunity to travel all over Africa to cover upcoming events on the continent.  She was recently cast in a feature film that will begin shooting in July 2009, and continues to have her hands on many different projects.

References

External links
Official website
Miss North Carolina former titleholders page
Miss USA official website

Living people
People from Goldsboro, North Carolina
UNC Hussman School of Journalism and Media alumni
Miss North Carolina USA winners
Miss USA 1997 delegates
Year of birth missing (living people)
20th-century American people